Chernoyarsky (masculine), Chernoyarskaya (feminine), or Chernoyarskoye (neuter) is the name of several rural localities in Russia:
Chernoyarsky, Republic of North Ossetia–Alania, a settlement in Novoosetinsky Rural Okrug of Mozdoksky District of the Republic of North Ossetia–Alania
Chernoyarsky, Sverdlovsk Oblast, a settlement under the administrative jurisdiction of the City of Serov, Sverdlovsk Oblast
Chernoyarskaya, a stanitsa in Novoosetinsky Rural Okrug of Mozdoksky District of the Republic of North Ossetia–Alania